Vidalia accola is a species of tephritid or fruit flies in the genus Vidalia of the family Tephritidae.

References

Trypetinae